Simmler is an unincorporated community in San Luis Obispo County, California, United States.

References

Unincorporated communities in California
Unincorporated communities in San Luis Obispo County, California